Mossley railway station in Mossley, Greater Manchester, England, is on the Huddersfield Line  north-east of Manchester Victoria and is managed by Northern, which do not provide any services to or from this station. Only TransPennine Express trains stop here.

Facilities
The station is a small, two-platform station, with the only on-site services being a ticket office. Outside of these times, tickets must be purchased on the train or prior to travel.  There is a waiting room on the southbound platform and a waiting shelter on the northbound side. Train running details are provided by telephone and timetable posters.

Disabled access to the station is limited, with wheelchair provision only being made for the Huddersfield to Manchester platform. As the Manchester to Huddersfield platform is accessible through a single staircase, disabled passengers often find it easier to travel on to Huddersfield and then disembark at Mossley on the opposite platform when the train makes its return journey.

Its walls are decorated with an art piece called "The Northern Lights".

Services
Since the May 2018 timetable change, TransPennine Express is the sole operator serving the station, despite the station still being operated by Northern Trains. TransPennine Express provide an hourly express service (including Sundays) to Huddersfield, Leeds & Hull eastbound and to Stalybridge & Manchester Piccadilly westbound.  Passengers wishing to travel to Manchester Victoria and points west must change at Stalybridge.

Planned upgrade

The Transpennine route through the station is being modernised and upgraded. It is planned as part of the upgrade that electrification of the line through the station will occur.

References

Further reading

External links

Railway stations in Tameside
DfT Category E stations
Former London and North Western Railway stations
Railway stations in Great Britain opened in 1849
Railway stations served by TransPennine Express
Railway stations in Great Britain not served by their managing company